Gabriele Veneziano (born 7 September 1942) is an Italian theoretical physicist widely considered the father of string theory. He has conducted most of his scientific activities at CERN in Geneva, Switzerland, and held the Chair of Elementary Particles, Gravitation and Cosmology at the Collège de France in Paris from 2004 to 2013, until the age of retirement there.

Life
Gabriele Veneziano was born in Florence. He pursued his doctoral studies at the Weizmann Institute of Science in Rehovot, Israel and obtained his PhD in 1967 under the supervision of Hector Rubinstein. During his stay in Israel, he collaborated, among others, with Marco Ademollo (a professor in Florence) and Miguel Virasoro (an Argentinian physicist who later became a professor in Italy). During his years at MIT, he collaborated with many colleagues and primarily with Sergio Fubini (an MIT professor, later member of the Theory Division and of the Directorate at CERN in Geneva,Switzerland).

Between 1968 and 1972 he worked at MIT and was a summer visitor of the Theory Division at CERN. In 1972 he accepted the Amos de Shalit Professor of Physics chair at the Weizmann Institute of Science in Rehovoth, Israel. In 1976-1978 he accepted a permanent position in the Theory Division at CERN in Geneva, Switzerland, a position that he held until the age of retirement in 2007 and where he is since then Honorary member. Between 1994 and 1997, he was Director of the Theory Division. He also held the chair of Elementary Particles, Gravitation and Cosmology at the College of France in Paris, France (2004-2013), of which he is currently Honorary Professor. He visited many Universities all over the world. More recently he was Global Distinguished Professor at New York University and is Sackler Professor at Tel-Aviv University.

Research
Gabriele Veneziano first formulated the foundations of string theory in 1968 when he discovered a string picture that could describe the interaction of strongly interacting particles. Veneziano discovered that the Euler Beta function, interpreted as a scattering amplitude, has many of the features needed to explain the physical properties of strongly interacting particles. This amplitude, known as the Veneziano amplitude, is interpreted as the scattering amplitude for four open string tachyons. In retrospect this work is now considered the founding of string theory although at the time it was not apparent the string picture would lead to a new theory of quantum gravity.

Veneziano's work led to intense research to try to explain the strong force by a field theory of strings about one fermi in length. The rise of quantum chromodynamics, a rival explanation of the strong force, led to a temporary loss of interest in string theories until the 1980s when interest was revived.

In 1991, he published a paper that shows how an inflationary cosmological model can be obtained from string theory, thus opening the door to a description of string cosmological pre-big bang scenarios.

Society memberships
National Academy of Sciences of Turin (1994);
Lincei National Academy (1996);
French Academy of Sciences (2002).

Awards
 Pomeranchuk Prize, 1999
 Gold medal della Repubblica Italiana come Benemerito della Cultura, 2000
 Dannie Heineman Prize for Mathematical Physics, from the American Physical Society, 2004
Enrico Fermi Prize from the Italian Physical Society, 2005
Albert Einstein Medal, Albert Einstein Institute, Bern, Switzerland, 2006
Oskar Klein Medal, 2007
Commendatore al merito della Repubblica Italiana, 2007
James Joyce Award, University College Dublin, 2009
Felice Pietro Chisesi and Caterina Tomassoni Prize, 2009
Dirac Medal by ICTP, 2014
Honorary doctorate, Swansea University, 2015
Friedel-Volterra Prize, by SIF and SFP, 2016–2017

References

External links
Scientific publications of Gabriele Veneziano on INSPIRE-HEP

1942 births
Academic staff of the Collège de France
People associated with CERN
Living people
Members of the French Academy of Sciences
Italian string theorists
Albert Einstein Medal recipients